Caviness is an unincorporated community in Lamar County, Texas, United States. In 2009, the population of the community was 90. On November 4, 2022, Caviness was devastated by a violent EF4 tornado with winds reaching . Numerous structures were completely destroyed, and some were completely swept away.

References 

Unincorporated communities in Lamar County, Texas
Unincorporated communities in Texas